An incomplete series of events which occurred in Italy in 1623:

 Treaty of Paris - A treaty signed in France by the Savoys and the Venetians, thus also an Italian treaty.

Births
 Giacomo Lauri (died 1694)
 Francesco di Maria, painter (died 1690)